Janice Logan (May 30, 1915 – October 23, 1965) was an American film actress.

Early years
Logan was a native of Chicago. Her father was Stuart Logan, "one of Chicago's leading investment brokers."

Film 
Logan's film debut came in Dr. Cyclops, in which she played Dr. Mary Robinson. She worked for Paramount in the late 1930s and during the 1940s. She also starred in Opened by Mistake (1940) with  Charles Ruggles. She starred in  Hotel de verano, directed by René Cardona in 1944. She was photographed by Leo Matiz in 1943 during the period of her career when she was filming Mexican movies.

Personal life
Logan was married to French journalist Jacques Schoeller.

Death 
Shirley Logan Schoeller died in 1965. She is buried at Rosehill Cemetery and Mausoleum, Chicago, Cook County Illinois next to her mother Gladys.

Filmography

References

External links 

 

1915 births
1965 deaths
American film actresses
Actresses from Chicago
20th-century American actresses